Ward Taylor Pendleton Johnston (born September 23, 1982), known professionally as Pendleton Ward or simply Pen Ward, is an American animator, screenwriter, producer, director, and voice actor who has worked for Cartoon Network Studios, Frederator Studios, and Netflix Animation. He created the Emmy Award-winning series Adventure Time, the Internet series Bravest Warriors, and the adult animated interview series The Midnight Gospel.

Early life
Ward grew up in San Antonio, Texas and currently resides in Los Angeles. His mother Bettie (born 1947) is an artist.

Ward became interested in animation at an early age, inspired by his mother, who is an artist and worked with animators. He started drawing flipbooks in first grade. He often worked with his best friend, Alec "The Logdog" Coates, on short comic books. He graduated from North East School of the Arts in San Antonio.

Ward attended CalArts, where he became friends with J. G. Quintel and Alex Hirsch. They later worked on The Marvelous Misadventures of Flapjack together. Eric Homan, vice president of Frederator Studios, offered Ward a job at the studios after watching one of his films at the annual CalArts animation screenings. Ward is a graduate of the school's Animation Program.

Career
In 2002–2003, Ward published a webcomic titled Bueno the Bear. He later took down the comics because he thought they were "terrible". However, he retains the name "buenothebear" for his website and his handle on sites such as Twitter. Ward later created a student film titled Barrista starring Bueno the Bear, released in 2005 on Channel Frederator.

Ward continued to work on short animations for Frederator's Random! Cartoons, which aired on the Nicktoons Network. There he worked with several people who would later join him on the Adventure Time series, including composer Casey James Basichis, Adam Muto and Niki Yang, many of whom had attended the California Institute of the Arts alongside Pen. His two shorts were The Bravest Warriors and the Adventure Time animated short. The Adventure Time short was made in 2006 and went on to become an internet phenomenon in 2007, with over a million views by November of that year. Ward initially pitched Adventure Time to Nickelodeon, but was rejected. It also took some time before Cartoon Network decided to pick it up.

In 2007, Ward was hired to work on the first season of Cartoon Network's The Marvelous Misadventures of Flapjack as a writer and storyboard artist. Flapjack was a storyboard-driven show, allowing the storyboard artists to write all the dialogue and draw all the action based on an outline assigned to them. The artists each worked in pairs, and during his time on Flapjack, Ward was partnered up with Mike Roth (who became the supervising producer of Regular Show) and later Alex Hirsch, who has since gone on to create the show Gravity Falls and develop Fish Hooks for Disney Channel. The experience inspired Pen to approach Adventure Time the same way once it was picked up as a series.

In 2012, Frederator Studios developed Bravest Warriors and turned it into a web series for the relaunch of Cartoon Hangover, however Ward has little involvement in the series. Former Adventure Time lead designer Phil Rynda worked on the redesigns of the characters for the series. The series premiered during the fall of 2012 through Cartoon Hangover's YouTube channel alongside a comic book series of the same name by Boom! Studios.

Ward released a short animation in support of LA Game Space that November, a project intending to build a games-focused exhibition space in Los Angeles. Ward announced development of a short game with Bennett Foddy entitled Cheque Please intended to be part of Experimental Game Pack 01, which the organisation released in 2013.

Sometime during the fifth season of Adventure Time, Ward abruptly stepped down from running the show, explaining it was negatively affecting his "quality of life". In the October 2, 2014 edition of the Rolling Stone magazine, Ward stated "I quit because it was driving me nuts". However, he continued to work as one of the show's writers and storyboard artists until the end of season six, and still served as an executive producer up until the series finale. In an interview with Indiewire prior to the debut of season seven, head writer Kent Osborne noted that Ward had stopped writing episode outlines at the beginning of season 7 but still looked over them and provided input.

In 2017, Ward was credited as "Story Consultant" for the current hard-cover adventure for the 5th Edition of Dungeons & Dragons, 'Tomb of Annihilation'.

In 2019, Card of Darkness, an Apple Arcade exclusive game, was released with Ward serving as art director.

On March 16, 2020, a trailer was released for an adult animated Netflix original show, The Midnight Gospel, co-created by Ward and Duncan Trussell. The plot reads, "Clancy is a space-caster who uses a multiverse simulator to interview beings living in other worlds." Eight episodes of the show were released on Netflix on April 20, 2020.

In 2021, Ward was credited with special thanks in the Double Fine-developed video game Psychonauts 2. Allegedly, Ward created an animatic that expressed interest in having the opening of the game be about a pregnant Raz, this can be seen in game in the level "Hollis' Hot Streak" where players are made to shoot a pen at a sign that spells out "Ward".

At the inaugural Children's and Family Emmy Awards ceremony held in 2022, Ward received an Emmy for "Outstanding Directing for an Animated Program" (alongside Ako Castuera, Luis Grane, Elizabeth Ito, and Bob Logan).

Filmography

Influences
Ward has previously stated that his friends, many of whom he works alongside on Adventure Time, are his biggest drawing and animating influences. In another interview, he explained that he was influenced by shows like The Ren & Stimpy Show, Beavis and Butt-Head, and The Simpsons. He would later go on to be a couch gag singer in the latter show's episode "Monty Burns' Fleeing Circus" in Season 28.

References

External links

 
 Art of the Title discussion with Ward about Adventure Time's titles

1982 births
Living people
American animated film directors
American male voice actors
American storyboard artists
American television writers
American male screenwriters
American male television writers
American voice directors
Television producers from Texas
American television directors
California Institute of the Arts alumni
People from San Antonio
Male actors from San Antonio
Primetime Emmy Award winners
Showrunners
Screenwriters from Texas
Animators from Texas
Cartoon Network Studios people